Kleive may refer to:

People
Iver Kleive (born 1949), a Norwegian composer and organist
Audun Kleive (born 1961), a Norwegian musician

Places
Kleive, Buskerud, a village in Ål municipality, Buskerud county, Norway
Kleive, Møre og Romsdal, a village in Molde municipality, Møre og Romsdal county, Norway
Kleive Church, a church in Molde municipality, Møre og Romsdal county, Norway